Hrbek (feminine Hrbková) is a Czech surname. Notable people with the surname include:

Kent Hrbek (born 1960), American baseball player
Michaela Hrbková (born 1987), Czech handball player
Petr Hrbek (born 1969), Czech ice hockey player

Czech-language surnames